Tom Walmsley (born December 13, 1948 in Liverpool, England) is a Canadian playwright, novelist, poet and screenwriter.

Born in Liverpool, Walmsley came to Canada with his family in 1952, and was raised in Oshawa, Ontario, and Lorraine, Quebec. He dropped out of high school and battled addictions as a young adult.

In addition to his plays, Walmsley was the winner of the first Three-Day Novel Contest in 1979 for his novel Doctor Tin. He later published a sequel, Shades, and another unrelated novel, Kid Stuff. Walmsley wrote the screenplay for Jerry Ciccoritti's film Paris, France in 1993. Ciccoritti also later adapted Walmsley's play Blood into a film.

Walmsley's style of writing ranges from the naturalistic to the poetic and, at times, the absurd. He moves easily between dramatic and comedic, and some of his "darkest" work is treated with a cutting sense of humour. His most common themes include sex (both hetero- and homosexual, often involving sado-masochistic fetishes, adulterous affairs, and, in the case of Blood, incest), violence, addiction (to alcohol and heroin in particular), and God (from a Christian perspective). He rarely deals with politics directly, although he openly displays a distaste for middle-class morality and social conservative interpretations of Christianity.

Early in his career, Walmsley summarized his sense of personal identity as "blond, stocky, below average height, uncircumcised, bisexual, tattooed, with bad teeth and very large feet".

Plays

 The Workingman, 1975
 The Jones Boy, 1977
 Something Red, 1978
 White Boys, 1982
 Getting Wrecked, 1985
 Mr. Nice Guy, (with Dolly Reisman)1985
 Maxine, 1995 (performance piece)
 Blood, 1995
 Delirium, 2006
 3 Squares a Day, 2006
 Descent, 2006
 The Nun's Vacation 2012

Poetry
 Rabies, 1975
 Lexington Hero, 1977
 Sin, 2005
 Honeymoon in Berlin, 2005
 What Happened, 2007
 Concrete Sky, 2009
 Rich and Dead as Dogs, 2012
 Sunday, Monday and Tuesday Weld, 2013

Novels
 Doctor Tin, 1979
 Shades, 1992
 Kid Stuff, 2004
 Dog Eat Rat, 2009 (978-1-894469-42-5)

Screenplays
 Paris, France, 1993
 Blood, 2005 (adaptation by Jerry Ciccoritti)

Libretto 
Julie Sits Waiting 2012

References

1948 births
20th-century Canadian dramatists and playwrights
21st-century Canadian dramatists and playwrights
20th-century Canadian novelists
21st-century Canadian novelists
Canadian male novelists
20th-century Canadian poets
Canadian male poets
21st-century Canadian poets
Living people
English dramatists and playwrights
Novelists from Liverpool
Poets from Liverpool
Canadian male screenwriters
People from Oshawa
Writers from Ontario
Canadian male dramatists and playwrights
English male novelists
English LGBT writers
Canadian LGBT novelists
Canadian LGBT poets
Canadian LGBT dramatists and playwrights
Bisexual men
LGBT Christians
20th-century Canadian male writers
21st-century Canadian male writers
20th-century Canadian screenwriters
Canadian bisexual writers
Bisexual screenwriters
Bisexual poets
Bisexual novelists
Bisexual dramatists and playwrights
21st-century Canadian LGBT people
20th-century Canadian LGBT people